Stenoma fusistrigella is a moth of the family Depressariidae. It is found in Brazil (Amazonas).

Adults are very pale fawn colour with broad wings, the forewings rectangular at the tips, with a diffuse oblique dark fawn-coloured band, which extends from before the middle of the costa to the base of the interior border. There is a blackish point in the disc at two-thirds of the length and there are very minute marginal points of dark fawn colour. The exterior border is nearly straight and hardly oblique. The hindwings are yellowish cinereous.

References

Moths described in 1864
Stenoma